Leah Robinson (born 7 November 1993) is a retired Canadian Paralympic athlete who competed in sprinting events. She is a two-time Parapan American Games medalist and has competed at two Paralympic Games.

Robinson was the youngest member of the Canadian team at the 2008 Summer Paralympics, she was fourteen years old at the time and competed in the 100m T37 and 200m T37 where she finished twelfth and tenth in the semifinals respectively.

References

External links
 
 

1993 births
Living people
Athletes (track and field) at the 2010 Commonwealth Games
Athletes (track and field) at the 2008 Summer Paralympics
Athletes (track and field) at the 2012 Summer Paralympics
Canadian female sprinters
Medalists at the 2015 Parapan American Games
Paralympic track and field athletes of Canada
Sportspeople from Kitchener, Ontario
University of Guelph alumni